Georges Gabriel Julien Edouard•de Marette de Lagarenne (27 July 1856 – 15 October 1929) was a French equestrian. He competed in the hacks and hunter combined event at the 1900 Summer Olympics.

References

External links

1886 births
1929 deaths
French male equestrians
Olympic equestrians of France
Equestrians at the 1900 Summer Olympics
Sportspeople from Alençon